Speed Weed is an American television writer and producer.

He is known for his work on the CBS drama NCIS: Los Angeles, Greg Berlanti's Political Animals, and for Syfy's Stephen King series Haven.

Career
Weed got his start penning an episode of the TNT drama Saved, starring Tom Everett Scott.

He went on to work on such series as the CBS' remake Eleventh Hour and Fox's short-lived supernatural drama New Amsterdam as writer and story editor, respectively.

In 2009, he joined the new CBS series NCIS: Los Angeles as an executive story editor and writer, scripting three installments ("Random on Purpose", "LD50", and "Fame"). The next season, he departed for NBC's long-running legal-crime series Law & Order: Special Victims Unit, as a co-producer and writer.

In summer 2012, writer/producer Greg Berlanti brought Weed aboard his USA event series Political Animals. He served as producer and wrote the episodes "Lost Boys" and "Resignation Day".

Weed served as a writer on the Syfy drama Haven from 2013-2015, penning six episodes in all ("Lost and Found", "Crush", "When the Bough Breaks", "Spotlight", "Much Ado About Mara", "Morbidity").

In summer 2015, Weed joined another series co-created by Berlanti, The CW's Arrow, as co-executive producer and writer. He first co-wrote the series' third episode of the fourth season, "Restoration", along with co-showrunner Wendy Mericle, and next co-scripted the seventh installment, "Brotherhood", with producer Keto Shimizu. He and co-producer Beth Schwartz wrote the 12th installment of the season, "Unchained". It featured the return of Roy Harper.

References

External links

American television writers
American male television writers
American television producers
Living people
Year of birth missing (living people)
Place of birth missing (living people)
American people of English descent